19th Battalion may refer to:

19th Battalion (Australia), a World War I ANZAC battalion
2/19th Battalion (Australia), a World War II Australian infantry battalion
19th Battalion (New Zealand), a World War II infantry battalion
19th (Central Ontario) Battalion, CEF, a World War I battalion for the Canadian Corps
19th Battalion (United States Marine Corps), a battalion in the Fleet Marine Corps Reserve
1st/19th Battalion, Royal New South Wales Regiment, a unit of the Australian Army Reserve

See also
 19th Corps (disambiguation)
 19th Division (disambiguation)
 19th Brigade (disambiguation)
 19th Regiment (disambiguation)
 19th Group (disambiguation)
 19th Squadron (disambiguation)